Bird Atlas is a 2021 coproduction drama film directed by Olmo Omerzu. It was included in the main competition for Karlovy Vary International Film Festival in August 2021.

Cast
Miroslav Donutil as Ivo
Alena Mihulová as Marie
Martin Pechlát as Martin
Eliška Křenková as Nina
Vojtěch Kotek as David
Pavla Beretová as Eva
Martin Havelka
Jan Vondráček
Philipp Schenker
David Bowles

References

External links
 
 Bird Atlas at CSFD.cz 

2021 films
2021 drama films
Czech drama films
Slovak drama films
Slovenian drama films
2020s Czech-language films